The Olethreutini are a tribe of tortrix moths.

Genera

Unplaced species
Argyroploce percnochlaena Meyrick, 1938

References 

 
Taxa named by Thomas de Grey, 6th Baron Walsingham